This is a list of XML editors. Note that any text editor can edit XML, so this page only lists software programs that specialize in this task. It doesn't include text editors that merely do simple syntax coloring or expanding and collapsing of nodes.

Desktop applications

See also 
 Integrated development environment
 XML
 XForms
 Machine-readable document

Commentary 
Spring Tools Suite and Eclipse have a variety of built-in and free plugins matching or exceeding the quality of the paid versions. They come with a content assist tool that completes tags and can search for classes in any java classpath. They also include validation, bean creation, and commit tools.

A plugin for Notepad++ named XML Tools is available. It contains many features including manual/automatic validation using both DTDs and XSDs, XPath evaluation, auto-completion, pretty print, and text conversion in addition to being able to work on multiple files at once. Other tools are available to edit XHTML.

References

Further reading 

 
  Adapted from

External links
 
 XML Editors on Wikidata

XML editors
XML editors